V-League 2006 was the 50th season of Vietnam's professional football league. Eurowindow was the league's sponsor for the first time, replacing Tan Hiep Phat.

Gạch Đồng Tâm Long An won their second title in this season.

League table

Dream Team
Manager  Henrique Calisto

Play-off

External links
Vietnam Football Federation

Vietnamese Super League seasons
Vietnam
Vietnam
1